St Anne's Academy is an 11–16 mixed comprehensive academy in Middleton area of the Metropolitan Borough of Rochdale in Greater Manchester, United Kingdom.  The school has specialist status in Teaching and Learning. The school has 800 students on roll,

History
St Anne's Academy opened in September 2007 replacing The Queen Elizabeth School that in turn was previously Hollin High School. The school  has a capacity of up to 900 places. The academy is jointly supported by the Church of England Diocese of Manchester, and David and Anne Crossland. In 2007 the Academy received £17.6 million to build additional and refurbish existing buildings. The project was funded by the Church of England, private backers David and Anne Crossland, founders of Airtours Travel and the Government’s Building Schools for the future programme. The work was completed summer 2012.

School Performance
During a 2012 Ofsted inspection the school was described as providing a good education to students providing guidance and support tailored to individual students needs with outstanding effectiveness of care, guidance and support. However pupil attendance was found to be Inadequate.

Alumni

Queen Elizabeth Grammar School
 Julie Goodyear (née Kemp) MBE, actress who played Bet Lynch in Coronation Street mainly from 1970–95
 Prof Philip Grime FRS, Professor of Botany from 1983-98 at the University of Sheffield
 Eric Ogden, Labour MP from 1964–83
 Bob Smithies, photographer
 Frank Tyson, cricketer
 Edward Francis Williams, Baron Francis-Williams CBE, Editor from 1936-40 of the Daily Herald
 Edgar Wood, architect

Hollin High School
 David Gedge, lead singer of The Wedding Present
 Peter Solowka, guitarist with The Wedding Present

References

Educational institutions established in 2007
Church of England secondary schools in the Diocese of Manchester
Secondary schools in the Metropolitan Borough of Rochdale
Academies in the Metropolitan Borough of Rochdale
2007 establishments in England